This is a list of Commemorative and Jubilee coins issued by the Ukrainian government.

Number of coins

Airplanes of Ukraine

 Commemorative Coins  "Mriya" AN-225 aircraft" (2002, silver)
 Commemorative Coins  "AN-2 aircraft" (2003, silver)
 Commemorative Coins  "AN-140 aircraft" (2004, silver)
 Commemorative Coins  "Ruslan" AN-124 aircraft" (2005, silver)

Ancient cities of Ukraine
 Jubilee Coin "900 years of Novgorod-Siversk Principality"
 Jubilee Coin "Bilgorod-Dnistrovskiy"
 Jubilee Coin  dedicated to 2600th anniversary of Kerch city
 Jubilee Coin "1100 Years of Poltava"
 Jubilee Coin "400 Years of Krolevetz"
 Jubilee Coin "1000 Years of Khotyn"
 Jubilee Coin "The Town of Romny (Romen) - 1100 years old"
 Jubilee Coin "2500 Years of Yevpatoria"
 Jubilee Coin "2500 Years of Balaklava"
 Jubilee Coin "350 Years of Kharkiv"
 Jubilee Coin "250 Years of Kirovohrad"
 Jubilee Coin "1300 Years of the town of Korosten'"
 Jubilee Coin "350 Years of the city of Sumy"
 Jubilee Coin "750 Years of the city of L'viv"
 Jubilee Coin "850 Years of the city of Sniatyn"

Architectural monuments of Ukraine
 Commemorative Coin "Temple of Our Lady's Christmas" in Kozelets
 Commemorative Coin "Khan Palace in Bakhchyserai"
 Commemorative Coin "Genoese Fortress in the town of Sudak"
 Commemorative Coin "Livadia Palace"
 Commemorative Coin "Pochayiv Lavra"
 Commemorative Coin "Golden gates"
 Commemorative Coin "St. Yura Cathedral" (2004, silver)
 Commemorative Coin "Sviatohirsky Lavra Monastery" (2005, silver)

Chinese zodiac
Commemorative Coin "Year of the Dog" (2006, silver)
Commemorative Coin "Year of the Pig" (2007, silver)
Commemorative Coin "Year of the Rat" (2008, silver)

Famous Families of Ukraine
 Commemorative Coin "Family of Ostrozhsky" (2004, silver)
 Commemorative Coin "The Family of Symyrenko" (2005, silver)

Flora and fauna
Jubilee Coins dedicated to 100th Anniversary of the Askania Nova Reserve
Commemorative Coin "Aquila Rapax"
Commemorative Coins "Plantathera Bifolia"
Commemorative Coins "Garden Dormouse"
Commemorative Coins "Potamon Tauricum"
Commemorative Coin "LYNX LYNX"
Jubilee Coin "100 Years of Mykolayiv Zoo"
Commemorative Coins "Larix Polonica Racib"
Commemorative Coins "Bubo bubo"
Commemorative Coins "BISON BONASUS"
Commemorative Coins "Hippocampus"
Commemorative Coins "Azov Dolphin"
Commemorative Coins "Spalax Arenarius Reshetnik"
Commemorative Coins "Grasshopper Ukrainian (POECILIMON UKRAINICUS)"

Folk Musical Instruments

Commemorative Coin "Bandura"
Commemorative Coin "Lyre"
Commemorative Coin "Tsymbaly"
Commemorative Coin "Buhay"

Heroes of Cossack Age
Commemorative coin "Cossack Mamay"
Commemorative Coin "Severyn Nalyvayko"
Jubilee Coin "The War of Liberation of the Mid-17th Century"
Commemorative Coin "Dmytro Vyshnevetsky (BAYDA)"
Commemorative Coin "Petro Doroshenko"
Commemorative Coin "Petro Sahaidachny"
Commemorative Coin "Ivan Mazepa"
Commemorative Coin "Ivan Sirko"
Commemorative Coin "Pylyp Orlyck"
Jubilee Coin "350 Years of the Battle by Batih"
Commemorative Coin "Pavlo Polubotok"
Commemorative Coin "Kyrylo Rozumovskyi"
Commemorative Coin "350 Years of Perejaslav Cossack Rada of 1654"
Jubilee Coin "500 Years to Cossack settlements, Kalmiuska palanqua"

Hetmans' capital cities
Commemorative coin "Baturyn" (2005, silver)
Commemorative coin "Chyhyryn"

Hero-Cities of Ukraine
Jubilee Coins "Hero-City of Kyiv"
Jubilee Coins "Hero-City of Odesa"
Jubilee Coins "Hero-City of Sevastopol"
Jubilee Coins "Hero-City of Kerch"

Higher educational establishments
Jubilee Coin "100 Years of Kyiv Polytechnical Institute"
Jubilee Coin "100 Years of the National Mining Academy of Ukraine"
Jubilee Coin "125 Years of Chernivtzi State University"
Jubilee Coin "Ostroh Academy"
Jubilee Coin "170 Years of the Kyiv National University "
Jubilee Coin "Ukraine National Academy of Law named after Yaroslav the Wise"
Jubilee Coin "200 Years to Kharkiv National University named after V.N.Karazin"
Jubilee Coin "75 Years to Zhukovsky Aerospace University in Kharkiv "
Jubilee Coin "100 Years to Kyiv National University for Economics "
Commemorative coin "Kharkiv National Economic University"
Jubilee coin "225 Years of Lviv National Medical University"
Commemorative Coins "165 Years of the Lviv Polytechnic National University"
Commemorative Coins "125 Years of the National Technical University “Kharkiv Polytechnic Institute"
Commemorative Coins "350 Years of the Ivan Franko National University of Lviv"

On the Edge of Millenniums
Commemorative Coin "On the Edge of Millenniums" (2000)
Commemorative Coin "On the Edge of Millenniums" (2001)

Outstanding Personalities of Ukraine
Jubilee coin "Lesya Ukrainka"
Jubilee coin "Bohdan Khmelnytsky"
Commemorative coins "Hryhoriy Skovoroda"
Jubilee coins "Mykhaylo Hrushevsky"
Jubilee Coin "Petro Mohyla"
Commemorative Coin "T.G. Shevchenko"
Jubilee coin "Yuri Kondratyuk"
Jubilee Coin "Solomiya Krushelnytska"
Jubilee Coin "Volodymyr Sosyura"
Jubilee Coin "Panas Myrny"
Commemorative Coin "Anatoliy Solovianenko"
Jubilee Coin "Ivan Kozlovsky"
Jubilee Coin "Vicentiy Khvoika"
Commemorative Coin "Oles' Honchar"
Jubilee Coin "Kateryna Bilokour"
Jubilee Coin "Mykhailo Ostrohradskiy"
Jubilee Coin "Mykhailo Drahomanov"
Jubilee Coin "200 Years of Volodymyr Daal"
Jubilee Coin "Mykola Lysenko"
Jubilee Coin "Leonid Hlibov"
Commemorative Coin "Viacheslav Chornovil"
Jubilee Coin "Volodymyr Vernadskyi"
Jubilee Coin "Volodymyr Korolenko"
Jubilee Coin "Boris Hmyria"
Jubilee Coin "Ostap Veresay"
Jubilee Coin "Vasyl Sukhomlynsky"
Jubilee Coin "Andriy Malyshko"
Jubilee Coin "Serhiy Lyfar"
Jubilee Coin "Maria Zankovetska"
Jubilee Coin "Oleksander Dovzhenko"
Jubilee Coin "Mykola Bazhan"
Jubilee Coin "Yuri Fedkovych"
Jubilee Coin "Mykhailo Maksymovych"
Jubilee Coin "Mykhailo Kotsubynsky"
Jubilee Coin "Mykhailo Deregus"
Jubilee Coin "Boris Liatoshynsky"
Jubilee Coin "Volodymyr Filatov"
Jubilee Coin "Ulas Samchuk"
Jubilee Coin "Pavlo Virsky"
Jubilee Coin "Maksym Rylsky"
Jubilee Coin "Serhiy Vsekhsviatsky"
Jubilee Coin "Oleksander Korniychuk"
Jubilee Coin  "Dmytro Yavornytsky"
Jubilee Coin  "Volodymyr Vynnychenko"
Jubilee Coin  "Vsevolod Holubovych"
Jubilee Coin  "Oleksiy Alchevsky"
Jubilee Coin  "Illia Mechnikov"
Jubilee Coin  "Oleh Antonov"
Jubilee Coin  "Heorhii Narbut"
Jubilee Coin  "Viacheslav Prokopovych"
Jubilee Coin  "Mykola Strazhesko"
Jubilee Coin  "Mykola Vasylenko"
Jubilee Coin  "Volodymyr Chekhivsky"
Jubilee Coins  "Ivan Franko"
Jubilee Coins  "Dmytro Lutsenko"

Points of interest of ancient cultures of Ukraine
Commemorative Coin "Paleolith"
Commemorative Coin "Triphylia"
Commemorative Coin "Olviya"
Commemorative Coin "Scythia"
Commemorative Coin "Kyivan Rus"

Princes of Ukraine
Commemorative Coin "Kyi"
Commemorative Coin "Danylo of Halych"
Commemorative Coin "Askold"
Commemorative Coin "Olga"
Commemorative Coin "Volodymyr the Great"
Commemorative Coin "Yaroslav the Wise"
Commemorative Coin "Svyatoslav"
Commemorative Coin "Volodymyr Monomakh"

Rebirth of Ukrainian Statehood
Jubilee Coin "Independence"
Commemorative Coin "First Anniversary of the Constitution of Ukraine"
Commemorative Coin "The 80th Anniversary of the Battle of Kruty"
Jubilee Coin "80 Years of Declaration of UPR Independence"
Jubilee Coin "80 Years of Declaration of Unification of Ukraine"
Jubilee Coins "10 Years of the National Bank of Ukraine"
Jubilee Coin "5 Years of the Constitution of Ukraine"
Jubilee Coin "10 Years of Ukraine Independency"
Jubilee Coin "10 Years of the Armed Forces of Ukraine"
Commemorative Coin "National Anthem of Ukraine"
Jubilee Coin "10 Years of the Constitution of Ukraine"
Jubilee Coin "15 Years of Ukraine Independency"
Jubilee Coins "10 Years to the currency reform in Ukraine"

Ritual Holidays of Ukraine
Commemorative Coins  "Christmas Holidays in Ukraine"
Commemorative Coins  "Easter Holiday"
Commemorative Coins  "Whitsunday"
Commemorative Coins  "The Protection of the Virgin"

Signs of the Zodiac
Commemorative Coin "Aries - The Ram" (5hr silver, 2006)
Commemorative Coin "Taurus - The Bull" (5 hr silver, 2006)
Commemorative Coin "Gemini - The Twins" (5 hr silver, 2006)
Commemorative Coin "Capricorn" (5hr silver, 2007)
Commemorative Coin "Aquarius - The Water-Bearer" (5hr silver, 2007)
Commemorative Coin "Pisces - The Fish" (5hr silver, 2007)
Commemorative Coin "Scorpio - The Scorpion" (5hr silver, 2007)
Commemorative Coin "Sagittarius - The Hunter" (5hr silver, 2007)
Commemorative Coin "Cancer - The Crab" (5hr silver, 2hr gold, 2008)
Commemorative Coin "Leo - The Lion" (5hr silver, 2hr gold, 2008)
Commemorative Coin "Virgo - The Virgin" (5hr silver, 2hr gold, 2008)
Commemorative Coin "Libra - The Scales" (5hr silver, 2hr gold, 2008)

Spiritual Treasures of Ukraine
Jubilee Coins "Desyatynna (Tithe) Church in Kyiv"
Commemorative coin "Kyiv-Pechersk Lavra"
Commemorative coin "The Savior Cathedral in Chernihiv"
Commemorative Coin "Orante"
Jubilee Coin "Kyiv Psalmbook"
Jubilee Coin "Aeneid"
Commemorative Coin "St.Michael's Golden-Domed Cathedral"
Commemorative Coins "The Kyiv-Pechersk Assumption Cathedral"
Commemorative coins "500 Years of Magdeburg Rights in Kyiv"
Commemorative Coin "Pectoral"
Commemorative Coin "Our Soul Does Not Die..."

Sports
Jubilee coins "Centennial of Modern Olympic Games"
Jubilee coins "First Participation in the Summer Olympic Games"
Commemorative coin "Ski"
Commemorative Coin "Biathlon"
Commemorative coin "Figure Skating"
Commemorative Coins "Triple Jump" (Sydney-2000)
Commemorative Coins "Parallel Bars" (Sydney-2000)
Commemorative Coin "Sailing sport" (Sydney-2000)
Commemorative Coin "Free Calisthenics" (Sydney-2000)
Commemorative Coins "Ice Dancing"
Commemorative Coin "Hockey"
Commemorative Coins "Skating Sport"
Commemorative Coin "Swimming"
Commemorative Coin "Boxing"
Commemorative Coin "Football World Cup (2006)"
Commemorative Coin "Games of the 28th Olympic Games"
Commemorative Coin "Twentieth Winter Olympic Games of 2006 "

The Smallest Golden Coin
Commemorative Coin "Salamander"
Commemorative Coin "Stork"
Commemorative Coin "Skyth_gold"
Commemorative Coin "Hedgehog"

2000 Years of Christmas
Commemorative Coins "Christmas"
Commemorative Coins "Baptizing of Rus"

History

Other coins 

 Jubilee Coin dedicated to the 50th Anniversary of Victory in the Great Patriotic War
 Jubilee Coins dedicated to the 50th Anniversary of the United Nations
 Commemorative Coin dedicated to 10 Years of the Chernobyl disaster
 Jubilee Coin "Sophiyivka"
 Commemorative coin "Coins of Ukraine"
 Jubilee coin "Kyiv Contract Fair"
 Commemorative Coin dedicated to the EBRD Annual Meeting of the Board of Governors in Kyiv in 1998
 Jubilee Coin "General Declaration on Human Rights"
 Jubilee Coin "55 Years of Liberation of Ukraine from Fascist Invaders"
 Jubilee Coin "55 Years of Victory in the Great Patriotic War of 1941-1945"
 Jubilee Coin "100 Years of L'viv Opera and Ballet Theatre"
 Commemorative Coin "Good to Children"
 Jubilee Coin "70th Anniversary of Dnipro Hydroelectric Power Station"
 Jubilee Coin "100 Years of the World Aviation and 70 Years of the National Aviation University"
 Jubilee Coin "150 Years of the Central State Historical Archives of Ukraine"
 Jubilee Coins "60 Years of Liberation of Kyiv from Fascist Invaders"
 Jubilee Coin "50 Years of the State Design Office "Pivdenne"
 Jubilee Coin "50 Years of Crimea Joining Ukraine"
 Commemorative Coin " Heroic Defence of Sevastopol in 1854 - 1856"
 Jubilee Coin "50 Years of Ukraine Membership in UNESCO"
 Commemorative Coin "Nuclear Power engineering of Ukraine"
 Commemorative Coin "Ice-breaker Captain Belousov"
 Jubilee Coin dedicated to the 60th Anniversary of Victory in the Great Patriotic War
 Jubilee Coin "50 Years to the Kyivmiskbud"
 Jubilee Coin "60 Years of Ukraine Membership in UN"
 Commemorative Coins "Sorochynsky Fair"
 Jubilee Coin "100 Years since foundation of the Institute for  wine growing and wine making named after Vasyl Tairov"
 Jubilee Coin "300 Years to David Guramishvili"
 Jubilee Coin "100 Years to Olha Kobylianska Music and Drama Theatre in Chernivtsi"
 Jubilee Coin "10 Years to the Academician Vernadsky Antarctic Station"
 Jubilee Coin "10 Years of the Clearing House"
 Jubilee Coin "140 Years of Taras Shevchenko All-Ukrainian “Prosvita” Society"

External links

 Commemorative and Jubilee Coins by The National Bank of Ukraine

Commemorative coins
Ukraine
Commemorative coins